Monsters in Hell is a ZX Spectrum game written by Martin Lewis and released by Softek in 1983. The player kills wizards by digging holes in the floor to watch them plummet to their death. The screen layout and gameplay are similar to the 1980 Universal arcade game Space Panic.

Gameplay

Reception
CRASH magazine wrote:

The magazine did not recommend the game, stating it "gives the impression of being out of date" with its "small, jerky character graphics" and  "lack of sound and not much use of colour".

References

External links
 

1983 video games
Platform games
Video games developed in the United Kingdom
Video game clones
ZX Spectrum games
ZX Spectrum-only games
Single-player video games